Mala Grabovnica may refer to:

 Mala Grabovnica (Brus)
 Mala Grabovnica (Leskovac)